Interpretive communities are a theoretical concept stemming from reader-response criticism and publicized by Stanley Fish although it was in use in other fields and may be found as early as 1964 in the "Historical News and Notices" of the Tennessee Historical Quarterly (p. 98) and also, and again before Fish's usage, in Richard Crouter's 1974 "H. Reinhold Neibuhr and Stoicism" in The Journal of Religious Ethics.
They appeared in an article by Fish in 1976 entitled "Interpreting the Variorum". Fish's theory states that a text does not have meaning outside of a set of cultural assumptions regarding both what the characters mean and how they should be interpreted. This cultural context often includes authorial intent, though it is not limited to it. Fish claims that we as individuals interpret texts because each of us is part of an interpretive community that gives us a particular way of reading a text. Furthermore, he claims, we cannot know whether someone is a part of our interpretive community or not, because any act of communication that we could engage in to tell whether we are part of the same interpretive community would have to be interpreted. That is, because we cannot escape our interpretive community, we can never really know its limits.

The idea has been very influential in reader-response criticism, though it has also been very controversial. It is often interpreted as a relativistic standpoint that "words have no meaning," though this is not what Fish means. Quite the contrary, Fish is a staunch advocate of his own readings of various texts. Rather, he means to point out that readings of a text are culturally constructed.

References

Literary criticism
Sociolinguistics
Types of communities